Felix Pratensis (Felice da Prato) (died 1539 in Rome) was a Sephardic (specifically Italian) Jewish scholar who embraced Roman Catholicism. He is known for his collaboration with the Flemish printer Daniel Bomberg on the first printed Hebrew Biblia Rabbinica (Veneta) of 1517/8.

He received a good education and acquired three languages. In 1518, he embraced Christianity and affiliated himself with the Roman Catholic Church. Having become an Augustinian friar, he devoted himself to proselytizing especially fellow Jews who had not embraced Christianity as he had. He displayed in his sermons great intolerance against his non-Messianic counterparts, earning for himself the sobriquet "the Jews' scourge."

Before his conversion to Roman Catholicism, Felix published a Latin translation of the Psalms, entitled Psalterium ex Hebræo ad Verbum Translatum, Venice, 1515.

References
Wolf, Bibl. Hebr. i. 918, iii. 935;
Moritz Steinschneider, Cat. Bodl. col. 2111
 and Paul Rieger, Geschichte der Juden in Rom, ii. 37

Notes

External links
 
 
 

1539 deaths
16th-century Italian Roman Catholic priests
Augustinian friars
Italian biblical scholars
Converts to Roman Catholicism from Judaism
Italian Sephardi Jews
Jewish scholars
16th-century Italian Jews
Year of birth unknown